Ibrahim Saleh Ibrahim Saleh Al-Mukhaini (born 20 June 1997) is an Omani footballer who plays for Al-Nasr Club in the Oman Professional League.

Honours
Individual
 Arabian Gulf Cup best goalkeeper: 2023

References

External links
 
 
 

1997 births
Living people
Omani footballers
Oman international footballers
Association football goalkeepers
Al-Nasr SC (Salalah) players
Oman Professional League players